This is a list of prefects of Međimurje County.

Prefects of Međimurje County (1993–present)

See also
Međimurje County

Notes

External links
World Statesmen - Međimurje County

Međimurje County